Croton–Harmon station is a train station in Croton-on-Hudson, New York. It serves the Metro-North Railroad's Hudson Line and all Amtrak lines running along the Empire Corridor. It is the main transfer point between the Hudson Line's local and express service and marks the northern endpoint of third-rail electrification on the route. 

Nearly all electric trains running on the Hudson Line originate and terminate here, though a handful of peak-direction rush hour trains do so further south at Greystone, Irvington, or Tarrytown. As the line's electrification ends just north of the station, trains traveling to or from points north (primarily the northern terminus, Poughkeepsie) are powered by dual-mode (electric/diesel) GE P32AC-DM locomotives.

Metro-North used to host an open house of the maintenance facilities every October. The last Open House was in 2008, with the event suspended indefinitely due to renovations of the Harmon shops.

Amtrak passengers can travel between the station and New York Penn Station on all Empire routes except the New York City section of the Lake Shore Limited, which stops here only to discharge passengers southbound and to receive passengers northbound.

History

The Hudson River Railroad, one of the forerunners of the New York Central Railroad, ran commuter trains to Poughkeepsie via Croton-on-Hudson as early as 1849. However, little is known of what became of earlier stations. The present station dates from the late 1950s, and was expanded to a multi-level facility in 1988.

Until April 1963, the station was known as simply Harmon. Trains continuing north of Harmon, including the flagship 20th Century Limited, would exchange their electric locomotive for a steam or diesel locomotive to continue the journey to points north and west.

As of August 2006, daily commuter ridership was 3368 and there are 1903 parking spots.

Station layout

The Village of Croton-on-Hudson operates the station parking lot. A great number of spots are reserved for long-term permit holders and village residents. There is also ample parking for daily use.

The station has three high-level island platforms each 10 cars long.

References

External links 

The Subway Nut - Croton-Harmon
Railroad History: New York Central Railroad Harmon Shops (Penny Vanderbilt)

Metro-North Railroad stations in New York (state)
Former New York Central Railroad stations
Amtrak stations in New York (state)
Railway stations in Westchester County, New York